"Corazonado" (English: "Presentiment") is a song by Puerto Rican singer Ricky Martin released as the only promotional single from his fourth studio album, Vuelve (1998) on January 12, 1999.

Chart performance
The song reached number twenty on the Hot Latin Songs in the United States.

Formats and track listings
US promotional CD single
"Corazonado" – 4:58

Charts

References

Ricky Martin songs
1999 singles
Spanish-language songs
Songs written by K. C. Porter
Pop ballads
Songs written by Draco Rosa
Songs written by Luis Gómez Escolar
1998 songs
Columbia Records singles